This is a list of seasons completed by the Missouri Tigers men's college basketball team.

Seasons

 Missouri vacated three tournament wins in 1994.
 Missouri vacated all wins from the 2013–2014 season in 2015.

References

 
Missouri Tigers
Missouri Tigers basketball seasons